The 1976 Nebraska Cornhuskers football team represented the University of Nebraska–Lincoln in the 1976 NCAA Division I football season. The team was coached by Tom Osborne and played their home games in Memorial Stadium in Lincoln, Nebraska.

Schedule

Roster

Depth chart

Coaching staff

Game summaries

LSU

Top-ranked Nebraska quickly found the scoreboard with a touchdown just four minutes into the game, but a failed extra point attempt was the first sign of trouble to come, as the Cornhuskers failed to score again against a fierce LSU defense.  The Tigers also struggled to make headway against the tenacious Blackshirts, managing just one field goal in each of the final two quarters, which resulted in a less than stellar beginning of the season for Nebraska as they were forced to settle for a 6-6 tie. LSU drove into field goal range in the closing seconds, but Mike Conway missed from 44 yards out.

Indiana

Nebraska pushed Indiana around all day to make up for the previous week's disappointing tie game, running out ahead 38-0 before Indiana managed to score.  Indiana had the slight edge in the air, but without enough points to back it up, the 248-89 Cornhusker domination on the ground told the story of the game.

TCU

TCU proposed to make it a game by scoring first, and was still in it with a slight 10-14 lag at the end of the 1st quarter, but the Horned Frogs proceeded to fall apart as the Cornhuskers quickly rolled off 50 unanswered points to steamroll their way to a 64-10 romp in the Lincoln home opener.  Nebraska QB Vince Ferragamo tied the Nebraska record of four touchdowns in a game (by halftime), while ground responsibilities were widely shared as 5th-string IB Byron Stewart ended up with the day's rushing lead at 64 yards.

Miami

A hard-hitting game saw several players leaving the field with injuries as Nebraska fought from behind for the second week in a row, after having to start the 2nd half down 0-6.  The Cornhuskers eventually wore the Hurricanes down in the end, putting up 10 more points while Miami was only able to add a field goal in their failed attempt to hold the lead.

Colorado

Colorado never did find the end zone, but Buffalo PK Mark Zetterberg split the uprights four times to account for all of Colorado's scores to put Nebraska behind 7-12 at the half.  Those 12 points were not nearly enough to overcome the Nebraska 2nd half effort which ran off an additional 17 unanswered points to pull away from Colorado for the win.

Kansas State

Nebraska smashed Kansas State to celebrate homecoming, holding the Wildcats to a painful -45 yards of negative progress on the ground, as the Cornhuskers did not even have to defend their side of the field until late in the 3rd quarter when Nebraska gave up an interception.  Still missing several players from injuries sustained in the previous two games, the Cornhusker machine rolled on anyway, as Nebraska QB Vince Ferragamo tied the school single-game touchdown record for the second time this season while the Blackshirts put up their only shutout of 1976.

Missouri

Missouri arrived in Lincoln on the way to owning an impressive upset thanks to a record-setting play.  Nebraska was behind 18-23 at the half, but had obtained two field goals to pull ahead 24-23 at the start of the 4th quarter.  The Tigers than scored on a spectacular 98-yard pass play and successful 2-point conversion to take the momentum back just two minutes later, and iced the win with 1:19 remaining on the game clock when they added 3 more on a field goal, handing the Cornhuskers their first loss of the season.

Kansas

Kansas took the brunt of Nebraska's frustration following their loss to Missouri the week prior, as the Blackshirts only allowed the Jayhawks to cross midfield twice all day, while the Cornhusker offense accumulated 483 yards of total offense in the one-sided game.  The lone Kansas score was a field goal against Nebraska reserves in the 4th quarter.

Oklahoma State

Both teams struggled to make progress against each other at the start as both defenses protected their end zones, and by the half only Oklahoma State had managed to put any points up, with a field goal midway through the 2nd quarter.  The defensive battle continued after halftime, but the Cornhuskers were finally able to secure a 3rd-quarter touchdown, only to have the Cowboys answer it four minutes later and retake the lead 10-7.  Nebraska was uncharacteristically losing the ground war, as Oklahoma State piled up a 291-121 edge in yards, and so turned to the air and found results as they amassed a 235-34 passing yardage lead, which included the game-winning touchdown pass with almost 12 minutes still remaining in the 4th quarter.  The Blackshirts held from there on out to secure the victory.

Iowa State

Turnovers took a brutal toll on Nebraska, as the Cornhuskers fumbled eight times and gave up an interception in Ames.  For the second week in a row, Nebraska was forced to go to the air for results as the Cyclones held them to just 77 rushing yards, but it was not enough, as Nebraska fell behind 0-10 early on and never recovered the lead in a heartbreaking road loss to an unranked team following their thrilling finish against #13 Oklahoma State the week before.

Oklahoma

Nebraska was outrushed on the day, lagging Oklahoma 185-357 on the ground and once again resorting to an air attack to stay in the game, yet the Cornhuskers were in the lead 17-13 when Oklahoma resorted to an unexpected air attack of their own to win.  The Sooners had only thrown two passes in the last two games combined, but used two pass plays in the final minutes to pull out the surprise win.  One pass, a 47-yarder from reserve Oklahoma HB Woodie Shepherd, was the first of his career, while the other was tossed by backup Oklahoma QB Dean Blevins 10 yards and then lateraled for an additional 22-yard gain.  The Cornhuskers, felled by passes from a ground-based team they had not defeated since 1971, was knocked out of the Orange Bowl.

Hawaii

In a lightly attended Honolulu game with more Cornhusker fans in attendance than locals, Nebraska punished Hawaii with a 47-0 lead before allowing the Rainbows to obtain their lone points of the day on a field goal near the end of the 3rd quarter, which was answered by an additional 21 straight Cornhusker points to close the game.  Nebraska's 655 yards of total offense was a new all-time school record, as was the 211 single game yards accumulated by IB Rick Berns, which succeeded the mark of 204 set by Frank Solich in 1965.  Nebraska SE Chuck Malito's 166 receiving yards also set a new single game school record, and Nebraska QB Vince Ferragamo broke David Humm's 1972 season touchdown record of 18 when he pushed his season total to 20.

Texas Tech

Nebraska was behind 17-14 at the half, and Texas Tech increased their lead shortly after the start of the 3rd when they posted another touchdown, and things were looking bleak for the Cornhuskers as the Red Raiders seemed to have an answer for everything Nebraska came up with.  Then, two minutes later, Nebraska found the end zone to pull within 4 points, and after managing to force Texas Tech into a punt that was partially blocked, the Cornhuskers scored again two minutes later to take the lead, and held on for the win.

Rankings

Awards

NFL and Pro Players
The following Nebraska players who participated in the 1976 season later moved on to the next level and joined a professional or semi-pro team as draftees or free agents.

References

Nebraska
Nebraska Cornhuskers football seasons
Bluebonnet Bowl champion seasons
Nebraska Cornhuskers football